Forăști is a commune located in Suceava County, Bukovina, northeastern Romania. It is composed of nine villages: namely Antoceni, Boura, Forăști, Manolea, Oniceni, Roșiori, Ruși, Țolești, and Uidești.

External links 

 8000 years old Starčevo-Criș settlement discovered at Forăști

References 

Communes in Suceava County
Localities in Western Moldavia